Kızılelma Cave is a cave in the Ayiçi naeihborhood of Zonguldak, northern Turkey. It is the country's second longest cave.

References

Caves of Turkey
Caves of Zonguldak Province
Zonguldak